The .30 Kiraly-Cristóbal Carbine, also known as the San Cristóbal or Cristóbal Automatic Rifle was manufactured by the Dominican Republic’s Armería San Cristóbal Weapon Factory.

History and development
Although called a carbine, the gun may be termed a submachine gun since it is identical to the Hungarian Danuvia 43M submachine gun. Both weapons were designed by Hungarian engineer Pál Király, who came to the Dominican Republic as an expatriate in 1948. The gun's name is a reference to the San Cristóbal Province, which is the birthplace of the late Dominican dictator, Generalissimo Rafael Trujillo. The Dominican Republic's military was the main user of this weapon although it was also exported to Cuba prior to the Cuban Revolution.

Description
The Cristóbal had a wooden stock, 30-round bottom-mounted box magazine, and tubular receiver with a fixed cocking handle on the right-hand side. It used lever-delayed blowback for its operation. The original version was produced in 9×19mm Parabellum. The most typical version of the Cristóbal was made in .30 Carbine.

Over 200,000 Cristóbals were made by the Armeria San Cristóbal from 1950 to 1966. After Trujillo’s assassination on May 31, 1961, the Dominican government decided not to maintain a local military industry and production was slowly wound down. By 1990, the Cristóbal was no longer a standard Dominican firearm, but continues to be used for basic training in the Dominican Republic's military schools.

This carbine was used by Che Guevara during the Cuban Revolution.

Users

References

 Rifles and Pistols, Jeremy Flack, Sunburst Books 1995

External links
 San Cristóbal carbine at Manowar's Hungarian Weapons
 San Cristóbal carbine
 Image of a Cristóbal Carbine field stripped
 right side of receiver
 detail view of triggers
 detail view of safety switch
 top detail view of receiver
 full view right side
 angled view right side

.30 Carbine firearms
Assault rifles
Carbines
Lever-delayed blowback firearms
History of the Dominican Republic
Weapons of the Dominican Republic
Hungarian inventions